Fox 47 may refer to one of the following stations affiliated with the Fox Broadcasting Company:

KXLT-TV, a television station licensed to Rochester, Minnesota, United States
WMSN-TV, a television station licensed to Madison, Wisconsin, United States
WSYM-TV, a television station licensed to Lansing, Michigan, United States